Volksblatt (German for "People's Journal") may refer to any of several newspapers:

 Giddings Deutsches Volksblatt, a German-American newspaper published 1899–1949 in Giddings, Texas
 Hermanner Volksblatt, a German-American newspaper published from around 1856 until 1928 in Hermann, Missouri
 Liechtensteiner Volksblatt, a daily newspaper in Liechtenstein
 Luxemburger Volksblatt (disambiguation), the title of multiple newspapers published in Luxembourg
 Mülhauser Volksblatt, a daily newspaper published 1892–1897 in Mülhausen (Mulhouse), Germany
 Neues Volksblatt, a newspaper published in Linz, Austria
 Ostrauer Volksblatt, a socialist newspaper published 1912–1922 in Austria-Hungary, later Czechoslovakia
 Pittsburger Volksblatt, a German-American newspaper published from 1859 to 1901 in Pittsburgh, Pennsylvania
 Tägliches Cincinnatier Volksblatt, a German-American newspaper published from 1836 until 1919 in Cincinnati, Ohio